The Vernon-Wister House is a historic house in Germantown, Philadelphia, Pennsylvania. It was built in 1803 by James Matthews, from whom John Wister purchased it in 1812. His son, John Wister, was a member of Congress and lived in Vernon until his death in 1883.

The Vernon-Wister House is a contributing property of the Colonial Germantown Historic District, which is listed in the National Register of Historic Places.

References
Jenkins, Charles Francis. The Guide Book to Historic Germantown, Prepared for the Site & Relic Society. 1926.
Marion, John Francis. Bicentennial City: Walking Tours of Historic Philadelphia. The Pyne Press, Princeton, 1974.

Specific

Houses completed in 1803
Houses in Philadelphia
Historic district contributing properties in Pennsylvania
Germantown, Philadelphia
Houses on the National Register of Historic Places in Philadelphia